ATP-dependent RNA helicase A (RHA; also known as DHX9, LKP, and NDHI) is an enzyme that in humans is encoded by the DHX9 gene.

Function 

DEAD/DEAH box helicases are proteins, and are putative RNA helicases. They are implicated in a number of cellular processes involving alteration of RNA secondary structure such as translation initiation, nuclear and mitochondrial splicing, and ribosome and spliceosome assembly. Based on their distribution patterns, some members of this family are believed to be involved in embryogenesis, spermatogenesis, and cellular growth and division. This gene encodes a DEAD box protein with RNA helicase activity. It may participate in melting of DNA:RNA hybrids, such as those that occur during transcription, and may play a role in X-linked gene expression. It contains 2 copies of a double-stranded RNA-binding domain, a DEXH core domain and an RGG box. The RNA-binding domains and RGG box influence and regulate RNA helicase activity. The DHX9 gene is located on the long arm q of  chromosome 1.

Interactions 

DHX9 has been shown to interact with:

 AKAP8L, 
 BRCA1, 
  DDX17 (p72)
  DDX5 (p68), 
 KHDRBS1, 
 MIZF, 
 NXF1, 
 PRMT1, 
 RELA,  and
 SMN1.

References

Further reading